Progesterone/hydroxyprogesterone heptanoate/α-tocopherol palmitate (P4/OHPH/VE), sold under the brand name Tocogestan, is a combination medication of progesterone (P4), a short-acting progestogen, hydroxyprogesterone heptanoate (OHPH), a long-acting progestogen, and α-tocopherol palmitate, a prodrug of α-tocopherol and form of vitamin E, which was previously used in France to support pregnancy in women but is no longer available. It contained 50 mg P4, 200 mg OHPH, and 250 mg in 2 mL oil solution, was provided in the form of 2 mL ampoules, and was administered by intramuscular injection.

See also
 List of combined sex-hormonal preparations § Progestogens

References

Abandoned drugs
Combination drugs
Progestogens
Vitamin E